The MTV Asia Awards 2005 (rebranded as MTV Asia Aid 2005) took place in Bangkok, Thailand on February 3, 2005. The event was held at the Impact Arena and was hosted by Alicia Keys. The ceremony was renamed as MTV Asia Aid 2005 in commemoration of the 2004 tsunami that took place several weeks before.

International awards

Favorite Pop Act

Blue
Keane
No Doubt
Outkast
Simple Plan

Favorite Rock Act

Green Day
Hoobastank
Jet
Sum 41
The Rasmus

Favorite Video

Franz Ferdinand — "Take Me Out"
Jet — "Are You Gonna Be My Girl"
Keane — "Everybody's Changing"
Kylie Minogue — "Red Blooded Woman"
Maroon 5 — "She Will Be Loved"

Favorite Female Artist

Alicia Keys
Avril Lavigne
Britney Spears
Kylie Minogue
Norah Jones

Favorite Male Artist

Enrique Iglesias
Josh Groban
Nelly
Robbie Williams
Usher

Favorite Breakthrough Artist

Ashlee Simpson
Jet
Joss Stone
Keane
The Rasmus

Regional awards

Favorite Artist Mainland China

Huaer Band
Jin Haixin
Sha Bao;iang
Sun Nan
Sun Yue

Favorite Artist Hong Kong

Andy Lau
Jacky Cheung
Joey Yung
Leo Ku
Twins

Favorite Artist India

Bombay Vikings
Jagjit Singh
Harry Anand
Shaan
Strings

Favorite Artist Indonesia

Agnes Monica
Ari Lasso
Glenn Fredly
Peterpan
Ten 2 Five

Favorite Artist Korea

Lee Soo-young
Rain
Seven
Shinhwa
Shin Seung-hun

Favorite Artist Malaysia

Misha Omar
Ruffedge
Siti Nurhaliza
Spider
Too Phat

Favorite Artist Philippines

Bamboo
Dice and K9
Parokya ni Edgar
Radioactive Sago Project
Rivermaya

Favorite Artist Singapore

A-do
Electrico
Huang Yida
Pug Jelly
Stefanie Sun

Favorite Artist Taiwan

F.I.R.
Jay Chou
Jolin Tsai
Mayday
S.H.E

Favorite Artist Thailand

A Cappella 7
Joey Boy
Lanna Commins
Modern Dog
Silly Fools

Special awards

The Asian Film Award 

Kung Fu Hustle

Voice of Asia 

Siti Nurhaliza

Inspiration Award 

2004 Tsunami victims

MTV Asia Awards
2005 music awards